A fairy is a type of mythical being or legendary creature in European folklore.

fairy (faery, faerie or faërie) may also refer to:

Tradition and mythology
Fairyland
The Faerie faith, a neopagan tradition
The Fairy Flag, a Scottish heirloom
Feri Tradition, a neopagan tradition

Animals and plants
Calypso (plant) or fairy slipper, a species of orchid
Fairy hummingbirds, in the genus Heliothryx
Fairy tern, a bird
Fairyfly, a wasp
Little penguin, formerly known as "fairy penguin"

Arts, entertainment, and media

Fictional entities
Fairy (Artemis Fowl), from the series Artemis Fowl
Faerie (DC Comics), comic book fictional place
 The Shobijin, the little sisters, or the name of the moth they ride in Mothra

Music
The Fairies, translation of Die Feen,  opera by Richard Wagner
The Fairies (British band), a 1960s British R&B band
Fairies (Japanese group), a Japanese girl group
Fairies (album), 2014

Other uses in entertainment
Faeries (1999 film), a 1999 animated film
Faeries (1981 film), a 1981 animated special
Faeries (anthology), an anthology of fantasy and science fiction short stories
Fairy chess piece, an unorthodox piece in a chess variant
The Fairies (TV series), an Australian live-action children's television series
Faeries (book)

Homosexual context
Fairy (gay slang), a slang term for gay men
Radical Faeries, an organization composed mostly of gay men

Other uses
Fairy (brand), a detergent brand owned by Procter and Gamble
Fairy (steamboat), a small wooden sidewheel-driven steamship
Fairy, Texas, an unincorporated community in Hamilton County, Texas
Fairy, codename of Special Operations Executive Agent Yvonne Cormeau (1909-1997)

See also
Fairey (disambiguation)
Fairy tale (disambiguation)
Fairyland (disambiguation)
Ferry (disambiguation)
Fay (disambiguation)
Fey (disambiguation)
List of beings referred to as fairies